Raksha Dave (born 22 August 1977) is an archaeologist and TV presenter, and is the current President of the Council for British Archaeology.

Early life and education 
Dave graduated with a degree in Archaeology from the Institute of Archaeology in London in 1999.

Personal life 
In April 2017, Dave married Nigel Jeffries, who is a medieval and post-medieval pottery expert at the Museum of London.

Career 
Dave worked with a commercial archaeological unit, primarily excavating in London with the Museum of London Archaeology Service. She also excavated at the World Heritage Site of Catalhoyuk in Turkey, and sites in Texas and Puerto Rico.

Dave featured regularly on Time Team between 2003 and 2013 as a field archaeologist. She was a presenter on season 7 of Digging for Britain, broadcast in 2018. She presented the BBC Learning Zone Ancient Voices programme on prehistory, broadcast in 2015, and co-presented Pompeii’s Final Hours: New Evidence for Channel 5.

Other TV work includes The Bone Detectives (2020) and Digging Up Britain's Past (2020).

Dave is an advocate for increasing the diversity of archaeologists, was a trustee for the Council for British Archaeology (CBA) and is a patron of its Young Archaeologists Club. In July 2021 CBA announced that Dave had taken up the three-year presidency of the organisation.

She is a co-founder of the archaeological social-enterprise DigVentures. 

Dave is a research affiliate of the Pitt Rivers Museum, University of Oxford.

References

External links
 

Alumni of University College London
Channel 4 presenters
Archaeologists appearing on Time Team
People associated with the Pitt Rivers Museum
British archaeologists
Living people
1977 births
British people of Gujarati descent
British women archaeologists